Across the Great Divide may refer to:

 Across the Great Divide (film), starring Robert Logan, Heather Rattray and Mark Edward Hall
 Across the Great Divide (album), a 1994 album box set by The Band
 "Across the Great Divide" (song), a song by The Band
 "Across the Great Divide", a song by Kate Wolf, covered by numerous others artists, including Nanci Griffith and Kyle Carey
 Across the Great Divide tour, an Australian tour by Powderfinger and Silverchair
 Across the Great Divide Tour (DVD), a DVD by Powderfinger and Silverchair featuring live performances from the tour